Something in the Water may refer to:
Something in the Water (film)
"Something in the Water" (Brooke Fraser song)
"Something in the Water" (Carrie Underwood song)
"Something in the Water", a song by Tom Grennan from the album Lighting Matches
 Somethin' in the Water, a 2001 album by Jeffrey Steele
"Somethin' in the Water", the album's title track, later recorded by Little Feat on their album Join the Band
"Something in the Water", a song by Terri Clark from her album Just the Same